Bronte Independent School District is a public school district based in Bronte, Texas (USA).

Located in Coke County, a portion of the district extends into Runnels County.

Bronte ISD has two campuses - Bronte High School (Grades 7-12) and Bronte Elementary School (Grades PK-6).

In 2009, the school district was rated "academically acceptable" by the Texas Education Agency.

The district provided educational services for the inmates at Coke County Juvenile Justice Center, a juvenile detention center operated by the GEO Group and contracted by the Texas Youth Commission. As of 2007, 21 district employees were based at the center. During that year, Alan Richey, the superintendent of Bronte ISD, estimated that 40% of the enrollment in the school district consisted of children who were incarcerated in the center. The superintendent said that the district lost $2 million in funding as a result of the closure of the juvenile facility, which occurred during that year.

References

External links

Bronte ISD

School districts in Coke County, Texas
School districts in Runnels County, Texas